The 2003 World Indoor Lacrosse Championship was the first World Indoor Lacrosse Championship, an international box lacrosse tournament organized by the Federation of International Lacrosse every four years. It took place from May 15 to 24 in Hamilton, Kitchener, Mississauga, and Oshawa, Ontario, Canada. Canada won the gold medal with a 21–4 victory over the Iroquois Nationals. The United States defeated Scotland 15–9 in the bronze medal game. Two other nations participated, Australia and the Czech Republic.

Preliminary round
Six participating teams played a round-robin in the preliminary round. The first place through fourth place teams each advanced to the semi-finals, while the fifth and sixth place teams advanced to the 5th place playoff.

Results

All times are local (UTC−4).

Final round

All times are local (UTC−4).

5th place game

Semi-finals

Bronze medal game

Gold medal game

Final standings

References

External links

World Indoor Lacrosse Championship
World Indoor Lacrosse Championship
Sports competitions in Hamilton, Ontario
Sport in Kitchener, Ontario
Sport in Mississauga
Sport in Oshawa
International lacrosse competitions hosted by Canada
World Indoor Lacrosse Championship
World Indoor Lacrosse Championship